Fremont County School District #38 is a public school district based in Arapahoe, Wyoming, United States.

Geography
Fremont County School District #38 is located in central Fremont County and serves the following communities:

Census-designated places (Note: All census-designated places are unincorporated.)
Arapahoe (most)
Johnstown (part)
Unincorporated places
St Stephens

Schools
Arapaho Charter High School (Grades 9–12)
Arapahoe School (Grades PK-8)

Student demographics
The following figures are as of October 1, 2009.

Total District Enrollment: 320
Student enrollment by gender
Male: 178 (55.63%)
Female: 142 (44.38%)
Student enrollment by ethnicity
American Indian or Alaska Native: 313 (97.81%)
Two or More Races: 3 (0.94%)
White: 4 (1.25%)

See also
List of school districts in Wyoming

References

External links

Education in Fremont County, Wyoming
School districts in Wyoming